The Orbserver in the Star House is the eleventh studio album by The Orb, released in August 2012, and featuring dub musician/producer Lee "Scratch" Perry. Singles from the album include "Golden Clouds" and "Soulman".

Track listing

References 

2012 albums
The Orb albums
Cooking Vinyl albums
The End Records albums